The following highways are numbered 398:

Canada
Manitoba Provincial Road 398

Japan
 Japan National Route 398

United States
  Arkansas Highway 398
  Nevada State Route 398
 New York:
  New York State Route 398 (former)
  County Route 398 (Erie County, New York)
  Virginia State Route 398